Marko Kilp (born 1 November 1993) is an Estonian cross-country skier. He competed in the 2018 Winter Olympics and in the 2022 Winter Olympics.

Cross-country skiing results
All results are sourced from the International Ski Federation (FIS).

Olympic Games

World Championships

World Cup

Season standings

References

1993 births
Living people
Cross-country skiers at the 2018 Winter Olympics
Cross-country skiers at the 2022 Winter Olympics
Estonian male cross-country skiers
Olympic cross-country skiers of Estonia
Sportspeople from Tallinn
21st-century Estonian people